Shunguli is a rural locality (a settlement) in "Posyolok Verkhny Baskunchak" of Akhtubinsky District, Astrakhan Oblast, Russia. The population was 20 as of 2010.

Geography 
Shunguli is located 47 km east of Akhtubinsk (the district's administrative centre) by road. Verkhny Baskunchak is the nearest rural locality.

References 

Rural localities in Akhtubinsky District